Linum lewisii (Linum perenne var. lewisii) (Lewis flax, blue flax or prairie flax) is a perennial plant in the family Linaceae, native to western North America from Alaska south to Baja California, and from the Pacific Coast east to the Mississippi River.

The flowers are pale blue or lavender to white, often veined in darker blue, with five petals 1–1.5 cm long.

The plant was named for North American explorer Meriwether Lewis.

Cultivation
Linum lewisii is extremely durable, even aggressive, in favorable conditions, successfully seeding even into established lawns.

Uses 
According to Melvin R. Gilmore, the seeds were gathered by Native Americans and cooked for their flavor and nutritious quality.

Some Native Americans used the fibers to make cordage.

References

Mojave Desert Wildflowers, Jon Mark Stewart, 1998, pg. 141
Illinois wildflowers: Linum perenne lewisii
Fine gardening: Linum lewisii

lewisii
Flora of the Western United States
Flora of California
Flora of Baja California
Drought-tolerant plants
Garden plants
Flora without expected TNC conservation status